Glaucosoma hebraicum, the West Australian dhufish , Westralian jewfish, or West Australian pearl perch, is a species of fish in the family Glaucosomatidae, the pearl perches. This species is important to local commercial fisheries and is also popular as a game fish.

Description
This species can reach  in total length, though most do not exceed . They reach maturity at the age of 3–4 years and can live for more than 40 years.

The pearlescent, silver-grey colour of this fish is broken by dark stripes. It is distinguished from a species found in the eastern states of Australia by a dark stripe over the eye region. This striping is prominent in juveniles and fades as the fish matures at about three or four years old.

Breeding and habitat
The peak breeding season is between December and March. They are broadcast spawners, with floating eggs developing into plankton-feeding pelagic larvae. Adults occurs in various inshore habitats, from hard flat shelf areas to reefs, wrecks, and underwater caverns and gutters.

References

External links
 Images. FishBase.

Glaucosomatidae
Fish of the Indian Ocean
Marine fish of Western Australia
Endemic fauna of Australia
Taxa named by John Richardson (naturalist)
Fish described in 1845
Australian cuisine